Laureano Olivares (born 16 September 1978) is a Venezuelan actor best known for his role in Elia Schneider's movie Sicario at the age of 16.

Filmography

Films
 Sicario (1994)
 Huelepega: Ley de la Calle (1999)
 Oro Diablo (2000)
 El Don (2002)
 Punto y Raya (2004)
 El Caracazo (2005)
 Postales de Leningrado (2007)
 The Zero Hour (2010)
 El Rumor de las Piedras (2011)
 Esclavo de Dios (2013)
 The Return (2013)
 Solo (2013)
 Las Caras del Diablo 2 (2014)
 Muerte Suspendida (2015)
 Tamara (2014)
 La Clase (2011)

Telenovelas
 Ciudad Bendita (Venevisión, 2006)
 Arroz con Leche (Venevision, 2007)
 ¿Vieja Yo? (Venevision, 2008)
 Tomasa Tequiero (Venevision, 2009)
 La mujer perfecta (Venevisión, 2010)
 Las Bandidas (Televen 2013)
 Virgen de la Calle (RTI, RCTV, Televisa 2013)

References

External links
 

Living people
1978 births
Venezuelan male telenovela actors
People from Caracas

fi:Laureano Olivares